Under Three Flags: Anarchism and the Anti-Colonial Imagination is a 2006 book by Benedict Anderson on the intersection of Philippine nationalism and late 19th century anarchism.

It was later republished as The Age of Globalization: Anarchists and the Anti-Colonial Imagination.

References

Bibliography

External links 

 

2006 non-fiction books
English-language books
Books about anarchism
History books about the Philippines
Philippine nationalism
Verso Books books